Vincent Castell (born 2 January 1992) is a French bobsledder. He competed in the four-man event at the 2018 Winter Olympics.

References

External links
 

1992 births
Living people
French male bobsledders
Olympic bobsledders of France
Bobsledders at the 2018 Winter Olympics
Place of birth missing (living people)